Camilla flavicauda  is a species of fly in the family Camillidae. It is found in the  Palearctic.

References

External links
Images representing Camilla at BOLD

Camillidae
Insects described in 1922
Muscomorph flies of Europe